Langenzersdorf is a town in the district of Korneuburg in Lower Austria, Austria.

Population

References

Cities and towns in Korneuburg District